Small Island Developing States (SIDS) are a group of developing countries that are small island countries and tend to share similar sustainable development challenges. These include small but growing populations, limited resources, remoteness, susceptibility to natural disasters, vulnerability to external shocks, excessive dependence on international trade, and fragile environments. Their growth and development are also held back by high communication, energy and transportation costs, irregular international transport volumes, disproportionately expensive public administration and infrastructure due to their small size, and little to no opportunity to create economies of scale. They consist of some of the most vulnerable countries to climate change.

The SIDS were first recognized as a distinct group of developing countries at the United Nations Conference on Environment and Development in June 1992. The Barbados Programme of Action was produced in 1994 to assist the SIDS in their sustainable development efforts. The United Nations Office of the High Representative for the Least Developed Countries, Landlocked Developing Countries and Small Island Developing States (UN-OHRLLS) represents the group of states.

List of SIDS 
As of 2020, the United Nations Department of Economic and Social Affairs lists 52 small island developing states. They are grouped into three geographic regions: the Caribbean; the Pacific; and Africa, Indian Ocean, Mediterranean and South China Sea (AIMS), including Associate Members of the Regional Commissions. Each of these regions has a regional cooperation body: the Caribbean Community, the Pacific Islands Forum and the Indian Ocean Commission respectively, which many SIDS are members or associate members of. In addition, most (but not all) SIDS are members of the Alliance of Small Island States (AOSIS), which performs lobbying and negotiating functions for the SIDS within the United Nations system. The UNCTAD website states that "the UN never established criteria to determine an official list of SIDS" but UNCTAD maintains a shorter, unofficial list on its website for analytical purposes.

Impacts of climate change 

SIDS are some of the regions most vulnerable to climate change. Due to their proximity to water, SIDS are especially vulnerable to the marine effects of climate change like sea level rise, ocean acidification, marine heatwaves, and the increase in cyclone intensity. Changing precipitation patterns could also cause droughts. Many citizens of SIDS live near a coastline, meaning that they have a high risk exposure to the effects of marine climate change. Additional climate change vulnerability comes through their economies: many SIDS have economies that are based on natural resources, such as ecotourism, fishing, or agriculture. Phenomena like sea level rise, coastal erosion, and severe storms have the potential to severely impact their economies.

Global goals 
Small island development states are mentioned in several of the Sustainable Development Goals. For example, Target 7 of Sustainable Development Goal 14 ("Life below Water") states: "By 2030, increase the economic benefits to small island developing States and least developed countries from the sustainable use of marine resources, including through sustainable management of fisheries, aquaculture and tourism".

Notes

See also
2010 United Nations Climate Change Conference
Organisation of African, Caribbean and Pacific States (OACPS)
Group of 77
Islands First (environmental organization)
Landlocked developing countries
List of island countries

References

External links
About SIDS, United Nations Office of the High Representative for the Least Developed Countries, Landlocked Developing Countries and Small Island Developing States
List of SIDS United Nations, Office of the High Representative for the Least Developed Countries, Landlocked Developing Countries and Small Island Developing States
United Nations Mandates and Resolutions on SIDS
AOSIS Members, Alliance of Small Island States
Chris Becker, International Monetary Fund, 'Small Island States in the Pacific: the Tyranny of Distance?'

1992 establishments
 
Geography
International development
+
Politics of climate change